Union County is one of the 36 counties in the U.S. state of Oregon. As of the 2020 census, the population was 26,196. Its county seat is La Grande.

Union County comprises the La Grande, OR Micropolitan Statistical Area. It is one of the eight counties of eastern Oregon.

History

According to Oregon Geographic Names, the county is named for the town of Union. Union County was originally part of Baker County (which was originally a part of Wasco County, which was originally part of Clackamas County). The northern end of the Grande Ronde Valley was the first part to be settled. During the 1860s, population growth in eastern Oregon prompted the State Legislature to split Umatilla and Baker Counties from Wasco County in 1862. Further settlement in the Grande Ronde Valley led to the division of Baker County to create Union County on October 14, 1864. The county doubled in population between 1880 and 1890.

The choice of a county seat resulted in competition, based on geography and on economic and population growth, between La Grande and the city of Union. The county seat alternated between Union and La Grande until it permanently came to rest at La Grande in 1905. Between 1875 and 1913, adjustments were made between Union County's borders and the borders of Baker, Umatilla, and Wallowa counties.

Geography

The Forest Service owns 47% of the land in the county.

Adjacent counties
 Umatilla County (northwest)
 Wallowa County (northeast)
 Baker County (southeast)
 Grant County (southwest)

Demographics

2000 census
As of the census of 2000, there were 24,530 people, 9,740 households, and 6,516 families living in the county.  The population density was 12 people per square mile (5/km2).  There were 10,603 housing units at an average density of 5 per square mile (2/km2).  The racial makeup of the county was 94.29% White,  0.85% Native American, 0.85% Asian, 0.62% Pacific Islander, 0.51% Black/African American, 1.22% from other races, and 1.67% from two or more races.  Hispanics and Latinos of any race constitute 2.45% of the population. 20.2% were of German, 15.5% American, 12.2% English and 10.5% Irish ancestry.

There were 9,740 households, out of which 30.00% had children under the age of 18 living with them, 55.10% were married couples living together, 8.50% had a female householder with no husband present, and 33.10% were non-families. 26.10% of all households were made up of individuals, and 10.80% had someone living alone who was 65 years of age or older.  The average household size was 2.45 and the average family size was 2.94.

In the county, the population was spread out, with 24.60% under the age of 18, 12.10% from 18 to 24, 23.50% from 25 to 44, 25.00% from 45 to 64, and 14.70% who were 65 years of age or older.  The median age was 38 years. For every 100 females there were 95.10 males.  For every 100 females age 18 and over, there were 92.40 males.

The median income for a household in the county was $33,738, and the median income for a family was $40,520. Males had a median income of $33,028 versus $21,740 for females. The per capita income for the county was $16,907.  About 8.50% of families and 13.80% of the population were below the poverty line, including 13.60% of those under age 18 and 9.50% of those age 65 or over.

2010 census
As of the 2010 census, there were 25,748 people, 10,501 households, and 6,804 families living in the county. The racial makeup of the county was 93.1% white, 1.1% American Indian, 0.9% Pacific islander, 0.8% Asian, 0.5% black or African American, 1.3% from other races, and 2.3% from two or more races. Those of Hispanic or Latino origin made up 3.9% of the population. In terms of ancestry, 25.2% were German, 17.8% were Irish, 17.3% were English, and 6.9% were American.

Of the 10,501 households, 28.2% had children under the age of 18 living with them, 51.3% were married couples living together, 9.5% had a female householder with no husband present, 35.2% were non-families, and 27.6% of all households were made up of individuals. The average household size was 2.38 and the average family size was 2.89. The median age was 40.0 years.

The median income for a household in the county was $42,162 and the median income for a family was $52,558. Males had a median income of $40,720 versus $30,373 for females. The per capita income for the county was $22,947. About 10.5% of families and 16.1% of the population were below the poverty line, including 22.6% of those under age 18 and 10.2% of those age 65 or over.

Communities

Cities

Cove
Elgin
Imbler
Island City
La Grande (county seat)
North Powder
Summerville
Union

Unincorporated communities

Alicel
Camp Elkanah
Hilgard
Hot Lake
Kamela
Medical Springs
Nibley
Orodell
Perry
Pondosa
Starkey
Telocaset

Government and politics

Like the rest of eastern Oregon, the majority of registered voters who are part of a political party in Union County belong to the Republican Party. In the 2016 presidential election, 65 percent of Union County voters voted for Republican Donald Trump, while 25 percent voted for Democrat Hillary Clinton and 10 percent of voters either voted for a Third Party candidate or wrote in a candidate. These numbers show a large shift away from the Democratic party towards third-party candidates when compared to the 2012 presidential election, when 63.2% of Union Country voters voted for Mitt Romney, 32.9% voted for Barack Obama, and 3.8% of voters either voted for a third party candidate or wrote in a candidate. In 2020, however, the third party turnout dropped to 2.62% and Joe Biden won 28.47% of the vote, but the Republican lean remained with Trump winning over 68% of the vote.

Oregon Legislative Assembly
Union County is located in Oregon State House District 58 which is currently represented by Bobby Levy. It is also located in Oregon State Senate District 29, represented by Bill Hansell. Both Levy and Hansell are registered Republicans.

Board of Commissioners
Union County is represented and governed by three commissioners. The Union County Board of Commissioners is currently made up of Paul Anderes, Matt Scarfo, and Donna Beverage.

Economy
The initial economic interest in Union County was mining, but most of the mines in the area were annexed by Baker County in 1901. The local economy continues to be based on natural resources, including farming (wheat, fruit, vegetables, mint, and grass seed), ranching (cattle and sheep), and timber. The ridges of Pyles Canyon are the site of the Elkhorn Valley Wind Farm, owned and operated by Horizon Wind Energy and whose power is sold to Idaho Power.  Since October 2010, the county board of commissioners has supported a "strategic investment program" for another wind power project in Oregon, Horizon Wind Energy's proposed Antelope Ridge Wind Farm; after delays due to concerns about the project's impact on wildlife,  the project has received support from Oregon Department of Fish and Wildlife.

Nearby mountains and streams offer hunting, fishing, skiing, and camping, all of which attract vacationers.  Attractions include the Anthony Lakes (and its ski area), Minam River, Mount Emily, Blue Mountains, Umatilla National Forest, Wallowa–Whitman National Forest (including Eagle Cap Wilderness), Catherine Creek State Park, Hilgard Junction State Recreation Area, Thief Valley Reservoir, Cove Hot Springs Pool, the Hot Lake Hotel (first built in the 1860s due to nearby hot springs), and the Eagle Cap Excursion Train.

Notes

References

External links
Official website
 Union County graveyards from Oregon Tombstone Transcription Project

 
1864 establishments in Oregon
Populated places established in 1864